M. V. Ramanamurthy (born 28 May 1965) is an Indian former cricketer. He played 36 first-class matches for Hyderabad between 1986 and 1994.

See also
 List of Hyderabad cricketers

References

External links
 

1965 births
Living people
Indian cricketers
Hyderabad cricketers
Place of birth missing (living people)